Kent, Alabama may refer to the following places in the U.S. state of Alabama:
Kent, Elmore County, Alabama
Kent, Pike County, Alabama